Survivor: Game Changers — Mamanuca Islands is the 34th season of the American CBS competitive reality television series Survivor, featuring 20 returning castaways. The season premiered on March 8, 2017 with a two-hour airing, marking the series' 500th episode, and ended on May 24, 2017, when Sarah Lacina was named the winner over Brad Culpepper and "Troyzan" Robertson in a 7–3–0 vote. 

This season was the third to film in Fiji after Survivor: Fiji and Survivor: Millennials vs. Gen X. It was the fourth season to feature entirely returning players, following Survivor: All-Stars, Survivor: Heroes vs. Villains, and Survivor: Cambodia and was the 11th season overall to feature returning players. 

This season introduced several alterations to the game format. The process for resolving a tied vote was changed for this season, removing the second ballot where only non-tied castaways were allowed to vote between the tied castaways and proceeding directly to the procedure to resolve a deadlocked tie: an open deliberation between non-tied voters. The rest of the process remained the same (however, there turned out to be no such scenario in the season). This format twist was retired in the following seasons, with the revote being re-introduced. The format of the Final Tribal Council, in which jurors individually addressed the finalists by delivering a statement or asking questions, was changed to a moderated discussion between the finalists and jurors.

Casting
According to host Jeff Probst, this season featured former contestants from the show that were considered "game changers"—those whose strategies and risky moves either affected or would have significantly affected, how their season played out. Probst stated that in preceding seasons, "we’ve had so many new players that were good players, and the game has continued to escalate in terms of the level of gameplay that it suddenly became apparent that we actually have a lot of great game players." Producers also sought out applicable contestants from earlier seasons in order to ensure a balanced representation of players from throughout the program's history.

Probst also pointed out that Game Changers was being cast while the 33rd season, Survivor: Millennials vs. Gen X, was still filming. Because of this, two of the 20 slots for Game Changers were reserved for Season 33 players, in case producers wanted to ask any of them back; should either spot have gone unfilled, producers had two earlier players in mind. Fiji winner Earl Cole was asked, but he dropped out due to injury. Worlds Apart co-runner-up Carolyn Rivera was considered for this season's cast, but she was cut by producers late into the casting process. Ultimately, Millennials vs. Gen X castaways Zeke Smith and Michaela Bradshaw were cast.

Ethan Zohn from Africa and All-Stars, Joe Anglim from Worlds Apart and Cambodia, Kelley Wentworth from San Juan Del Sur and Cambodia, Danni Boatwright from Guatemala, Sabrina Thompson from One World, and Corinne Kaplan from Gabon and Caramoan were asked, but they declined. Anglim and Wentworth would both eventually return for Edge of Extinction and Zohn and Boatwright would return for Winners at War. Marty Piombo from Nicaragua, Jon Misch from San Juan Del Sur, John Cody from Blood vs. Water, Worlds Apart winner Mike Holloway, Alexis Maxwell and LJ McKanas from Cagayan, Sophie Clarke from South Pacific, Jonathan Penner from Cook Islands, Micronesia, and Philippines were also contacted, but ultimately cut. Clarke would eventually return for Winners at War.

San Juan Del Sur winner Natalie Anderson was originally cast on the season as well, but she ultimately had to back out shortly before filming began due to medical reasons. Her spot was filled on short notice by Worlds Apart contestant Sierra Dawn Thomas. Anderson later returned for Winners at War.

Contestants

Future appearances
Aubry Bracco returned for Survivor: Edge of Extinction. Sandra Diaz-Twine returned in Survivor: Island of the Idols to serve as a mentor alongside Rob Mariano. Sarah Lacina, Tony Vlachos, and Sandra Diaz-Twine returned to compete on Survivor: Winners at War. Diaz-Twine also competed on Australian Survivor: Blood V Water with her daughter Nina.

Outside of Survivor, Caleb Reynolds competed on the premiere of Candy Crush. Reynolds and Sierra Dawn Thomas competed on separate teams on a Survivor vs Big Brother episode of Fear Factor. Michaela Bradshaw competed on the thirty-seventh season of The Challenge. In 2022, Lacina competed on The Challenge: USA. Malcolm Freberg and Cirie Fields competed on the 2022 USA Network reality competition series Snake in the Grass. Fields also competed on the 2023 Peacock reality TV series The Traitors.

Season summary
The 20 returning players were initially divided into two tribes: Mana and Nuku. Nuku fared much better in challenges; throughout two tribe switches, original tribal lines held strong and the Nuku members were able to eliminate most of the Mana tribe. 
 
When the tribes merged, two main factions emerged: an alliance led by Sierra and Brad and one led by Andrea and Cirie, with Sarah navigating between the two groups to eliminate threats on both sides. She used her social connections and game advantages to protect herself from betrayal by Andrea and Cirie's alliance. Meanwhile, Brad won the final four consecutive immunity challenges, and Sarah ultimately aligned with him and Troyzan to reach the end of the game together.
 
At the Final Tribal Council, Troyzan was overlooked by the jury for being Brad's follower throughout the game, and went on to receive no votes to win. Sarah was commended for her strategic control and social flexibility but criticized for manipulating personal relations for strategic gain, while Brad was lauded for his challenge prowess but condemned for his condescending attitude. Ultimately, the jury awarded Sarah the title of Sole Survivor with seven votes to Brad's three.

Episodes

Voting history

Notes

Reception

Critical response
Survivor: Game Changers was met with generally mixed reception. Daniel Fienberg of The Hollywood Reporter gave the season and the finale a mixed review, criticizing the season's confusing direction, saying the season "was pretty good for me for a long time and then it started becoming increasingly confusing, both in terms of in-game momentum and the editing, which relied excessively on misdirection that actually left viewers unable to understand several big votes. Then 90 percent of Wednesday's season finale was infuriating for me, with one frustrating vote after another seemingly leading to a result that I was prepared to be irritated by." He did, however, applaud the winner, saying "The correct person was victorious. And a Survivor season ending up with the 'right' winner, or a winner whose path to victory I could see and endorse goes a long way toward me making my peace with a season."  

Dalton Ross, of Entertainment Weekly also had mixed feelings towards the season, believing that the final four were "not nearly as engaging or exciting a group as one that would have included any number of people who got voted out early" but still believed that "the right person won." He also noted "there were simply too many immunities and advantages in the game" which became evident in the Tribal Council where contestant Cirie Fields was eliminated because she was the only contestant of the six remaining not to possess immunity from elimination in some form. "It was almost too much and demonstrates how Game Changers was more about crazy events than solid character arcs." Ross would later rank the season 20th out of the 40 seasons.

In 2020, the "Purple Rock Podcast" ranked this season 28th out of 40 saying that "abundance of twists and turns makes the season struggle narratively" but "there are some excellent episodes along the way, and the winner plays a very strong game".

In 2020, Inside Survivor ranked this season 31st out of 40 acknowledging the exciting pre-merge but criticizing the imbalanced cast, the lackluster post-merge, and the lack of a cohesive story.

In 2021, Rob Has a Podcast ranked Game Changers 31st during their Survivor All-Time Top 40 Rankings podcast.

Controversy
The incident where Jeff Varner outed fellow contestant Zeke Smith as transgender was covered by various news outlets, with fans heavily criticizing Varner's actions. Varner explained himself following the episode's airing and expressed regret for his actions, but was subsequently fired from his job due to the negative publicity over his outing of Smith. According to The New York Times, between the episode's taping and airing, CBS and the producers of Survivor worked with Smith as well as the advocacy group GLAAD to determine how best to handle the episode. CBS's handling of the incident, including its decision to broadcast, drew mixed response. Ira Madison III of MTV News argued that the episode was "irresponsible" because it put "Varner's words on air" without "actively repudiating them," explaining that while Varner was chastised for his actions his words went unchallenged. In a column for Slate Magazine, however, David Canfield praised the show's handling of a politically sensitive topic: "It’s safe to say that never before in popular culture had a large American audience been guided into witnessing such forceful, persuasive, and (seemingly) unprompted advocacy for the trans community...With fundamental trans rights still a point of debate in standard political discourse, the collective rejection of anti-trans bigotry [sic] that Survivor put on display is major."

Ratings
The March 8 premiere episode "The Stakes Have Been Raised" faced the smallest viewer audience in the show's history, watched by only 7.643 million viewers and receiving just a 1.7/8 rating/share in the critical 18–49 demographic. While ratings were substantially down from the Survivor: Kaôh Rōng and Survivor: Millennials vs. Gen X premieres in February and September the year prior, the series still ranked first in its timeslot, but tied with ABC's The Goldbergs for the 18-49 demo. The series also managed to edge out ABC's Modern Family for total viewership, ranking first but placing second within the demo for the night.

U.S. Nielsen ratings

References

External links
 Official CBS Survivor website

2016 in Fiji
2017 American television seasons
34
Television shows filmed in Fiji
Television shows set in Fiji